This is a list of contestants who have appeared on the Mexican television show Mexico's Next Top Model. Contestants compete against each other to become the next top Mexican top model. They are judged by model Jaydy Michel  (Elsa Benítez in previous cycles) and her panel of judges, to win a modeling contract with a top modeling agency and along with other prizes. The series first aired in 2009 and as of 2014, there have been five cycles.

References

 
Lists of Mexican people
Mexico's Next Top Model contestants